The 2010 2. divisjon season was the men's third-tier football competition in Norway.

26 games were played in 4 groups, with 3 points given for wins and 1 for draws. HamKam, Notodden, Stavanger and Skeid were relegated from the 2009 Norwegian First Division. Asker, Hødd, Randaberg and HamKam were promoted to the 2011 1. divisjon. Number twelve, thirteen and fourteen were relegated to the 3. divisjon, except for the number twelve team with the most points. The winning teams from each of the 24 groups in the 3. divisjon each faced a winning team from another group in a playoff match, resulting in 12 playoff winners which were promoted to the 2011 2. divisjon.

League tables

Group 1

Group 2

Group 3

Group 4

Top goalscorers

Source: Group 1, Group 2, Group 3 & Group 4.

Promotion playoff

References
Tables
Top goalscorers

Norwegian Second Division seasons
3
Norway
Norway